The University of Colorado Denver School of Public Affairs is located in the Lower Downtown ("LoDo") district of Denver, Colorado. The School is fully accredited by the Network of Schools of Public Policy, Affairs, and Administration (NASPAA).  The School enrolls approximately many students in graduate programs in public administration, public affairs, and criminal justice, and undergraduate programs in criminal justice and public service.

Academics 

The School of Public Affairs offers a number of highly ranked programs, including environmental policy and management (ranked 11th), nonprofit management (21st), public management and leadership (23rd), and public finance and budgeting (17th). The online Master of Criminal Justice program was ranked 19th nationwide in January 2019.

Degree programs

Public affairs and administration 

 Doctor of Philosophy in Public Affairs
 Master of Public Administration
 Bachelor of Arts in Public Service
 Dual Master of Public Administration / Master of Criminal Justice
 Dual Master of Public Administration / Juris Doctor (Boulder)
 Dual Master of Public Administration / Master's in Economics
 Dual Master of Public Administration / Master of Public Health
 Dual Master of Public Administration / Master of Urban and Regional Planning
 Pathway Bachelor of Arts in Public Service / Master of Public Administration

Criminal Justice 

 Bachelor of Arts in Criminal Justice
 Master of Criminal Justice
 Pathway Bachelor of Arts / Master of Criminal Justice
 Dual Master of Criminal Justice / Master of Public Administration

Concentration areas 

Both the Master of Public Administration and Master of Criminal Justice programs offer students the opportunity to select a concentration area within the degree. Approximately one-third of the master's students select and complete a specific concentration; others choose electives from a variety of concentration areas to best meet their professional goals.

 Crime Analyst
 Disasters, Hazards and Emergency Management
Emergency Management and Homeland Security
 Environmental Policy and Management
Gender-Based Violence
 Local Government
 Nonprofit Organizations

Graduate certificates 

The School of Public Affairs offers a variety of graduate certificates to help individuals advance in their career. Anyone who has completed a bachelor's degree from an accredited university is eligible to enroll in one of the School's graduate certificate programs.

 Crime Analyst
 Disasters, Hazards and Emergency Management
Emergency Management and Homeland Security
 Environmental Policy and Management
 Gender-Based Violence
 Local Government
 Non-profit Organizations

Other certificate programs 

 Colorado Certified Public Manager Program: The School offers a nationally accredited certification program for public managers that consists of 12 modules conducted via weekend seminars and an online format.
 Sustainable Urban Infrastructure Certificate: The School is a partner in the Center for Sustainable Infrastructure Systems and offers a multi-disciplinary, four-course certificate in Sustainable Urban Infrastructure.

Research and outreach

Faculty roster 

The School of Public Affairs has 22 tenure-track faculty members and a number of instructors and lecturers.

Paul Teske, a University of Colorado Distinguished Professor, was appointed Dean of the School in July 2008. Prior to his appointment as Dean, Teske served as the Director of the Center for Education Policy Analysis and Director of the Center on Reinventing Public Education at the School of Public Affairs, in addition to his teaching and research activities as a professor. He earned his Ph.D. and M.P.A. degrees in Public Affairs from the Woodrow Wilson School of Public and International Affairs at Princeton University. Teske received a B.A. in economics and political science, with highest honors in economics, from the University of North Carolina at Chapel Hill, where he was a James Johnston Scholar and Phi Beta Kappa.

Research centers

Center for Education Policy Analysis 
Led by Dean Paul Teske, the Center for Education Policy Analysis CEPA works with state, local and nonprofit partners interested in analysis of school finance, governance, innovation and reform, and policy implementation. The Center also manages the Education Policy Fellowship Program.

Center for Local Government 
As director of the Center for Local Government, Dr. Toddy Ely works with city managers, the Colorado Municipal League, the Denver Regional Council of Governments, the Colorado Department of Local Affairs and others on local government issues like fiscal indicators, resilient response to emergencies and transit-oriented development. Training is offered through the Center's Certified Public Manager program.

Center on Domestic Violence 
Founded in 2000, the CDV is an academic, research and service center whose work focuses on ending domestic violence by fostering institutional and social change through leadership development, education, research and community collaboration. The Center is led by Barbara Paradiso.

Center on Network Science 
Drs. Danielle Varda and Robyn Mobbs co-direct the Center on Network Science, which works to improve network systems by serving as a resource for network managers and leaders. Training is offered through the Network Leadership Training Academy.

Criminology and Criminal Justice Research Initiative 
The Criminology and Criminal Justice Research Initiative serves as a resource for public, private and nonprofit criminal justice entities that respond to crime and victimization issues in Colorado. The initiative is co-led by Drs. Lonnie Schaible and Angela Gover.

Wirth Chair in Sustainable Development 
The University of Colorado established the Wirth Chair in Environmental and Community Development Policy in 1993. It honors the environmental and sustainable development achievements of former Senator and Undersecretary of State Timothy E. Wirth. The Wirth program works to fulfill its mission through a variety of ongoing programs and activities, including monthly Sustainability Series events, the annual Wirth Chair Sustainability Awards, and extended learning trips to international sustainability sites. The current Wirth Chair is Mark Safty.

Workshop on policy process research 
Drs. Chris Weible and Tanya Heikkila run this workshop, which focuses on how difficult policy issues, especially in the area of environmental policy, are discussed and resolved. Recent work has focused on organic agriculture regulation, aquaculture, fracking and water policy in Colorado.

Leadership and governance training

Certified Public Manager Program 
Designed to offer individuals in the public and nonprofit sectors an opportunity to develop and improve their management and leadership skills.

Colorado Education Policy Fellows Program 
Participants hold full-time positions in diverse organizations at the local, state and national levels.

Denver Community Leadership Forum 
The program aims to build strong linkages and working relationships among leaders from different sectors and provide an understanding of new leadership needs and capacities.

Network Leadership Training Academy 
This training includes conversations about network leadership, activities to share and demonstrate skills and ideas, and tools to translate back to practice.

Rocky Mountain Leadership Program 
Attendees include elected officials and upper-level managers from the federal, state and local levels of government, and nonprofits.

Summer Institute in Education Systems Leadership and Policy 
This week-long interactive seminar in Denver, Colorado, is designed for current and aspiring leaders and entrepreneurs working in public and private sector organizations engaged in education systems transformation and redesign. The institute is led by Scholar in Residence Parker Baxter.

Notable people

Alumni 

The School of Public Affairs has more than 7,000 alumni around the globe. Many of them hold prominent leadership positions, including the 5 who made the 2015 "40 Under 40" list in the Denver Business Journal.

Awards and honors
 Angela Gover, Professor: 2017 Founder's Award from the Academy of Criminal Justice Sciences (Feb. 2017)
 Mark Pogrebin, Professor: 2016 David R. Maines Narrative Research Award (Nov. 2016)
 Callie Rennison, Professor: 2016 Bonnie S. Fisher Victimology Career Award (Nov. 2016)
 Guyrene Ben, MPA Student: 2015 CU President's Student Diversity award for her work with American Indian STEM students (May 2015)
 Tanya Heikkila, Professor: 2015 CU Denver Graduate School Dean's Mentoring Award (April 2015)
 Mary Guy, Professor: 2015 CU Denver campus Award for Excellence in Leadership and Service (April 2015)
 Lucy Dwight, Senior Instructor: elected Secretary of the Faculty Assembly for the University of Colorado Denver (April 2015)

Leo C. Riethmayer Outstanding Colorado Public Administrator Award 
Named for the School's founder, the Riethmayer Award annually recognizes a distinguished Colorado public servant. Past recipients include:

Former faculty 
 Leo Riethmayer, Professor, Founder of the School of Public Affairs
 John Buechner, Professor and President Emeritus of the University of Colorado
 Marshall Kaplan, Professor, Dean Emerita (1981-1995)
 Peter deLeon, Distinguished Professor
 Linda deLeon, Associate Professor and Associate Dean
 Kathleen Beatty, Professor, Dean Emerita (1996-2008)

References 

 
Auraria Campus
Universities and colleges in Denver